Lieutenant General Sir (Edwin) Otway Herbert KBE CB DSO (19 November 19014 April 1984) was a senior British Army officer who served during the Second World War and achieved high command in the 1950s.

Military career
Herbert attended the Royal Military College, Sandhurst and was commissioned as a second lieutenant into the British Army's Royal Artillery on 22 December 1921. He served in Egypt between 1928 and 1935. Returning to the United Kingdom, he became brigade major for the 27th (Home Counties) Anti-Aircraft Group in 1935.

He served in the Second World War (1939–1945) initially as deputy assistant adjutant-general for 27 Anti-Aircraft Group, then deployed to France and Belgium with the British Expeditionary Force (BEF). On 1 March 1942 he took over as Commanding Officer (CO) of the 6th Battalion, King's Shropshire Light Infantry with the task of converting it into the 181st Field Regiment, Royal Artillery. In August 1942 he joined the 132nd (Welsh) Field Regiment, Royal Artillery, which formed part of the 78th "Battleaxe" Infantry Division and commanded it in the Tunisian campaign. In 1943 he joined the 21st Army Group in England and later in Northwest Europe.

After the war he became Commander Royal Artillery for 5th Division moving on to be Commandant of the British Sector in Berlin in 1947. He became Director Territorial Army (TA) and Cadets at the War Office in 1949 and General Officer Commanding (GOC) 44th (Home Counties) Infantry Division in 1952. He was General Officer Commanding-in-Chief (GOC-in-C) West Africa Command from 1953 earning the distinction of being the last soldier to hold this command. He was GOC-in-C Western Command from 1957 and retired from the British Army in 1960. He was also Colonel Commandant of the Royal Artillery from 1956 to 1966.

He lived at Brynsiencyn in Anglesey.

Family
In 1925 he married Muriel Irlam Barlow and together they went on to have a daughter.

References

Bibliography
Don Neal, Guns and Bugles: The Story of the 6th Bn KSLI – 181st Field Regiment RA 1940–1946, Studley: Brewin, 2001, .

External links
British Army Officers 1939−1945
Generals of World War II
Liddell Hart Centre for Military Archives

 

|-

|-
 

|-
 

1901 births
1984 deaths
British Army lieutenant generals
British Army brigadiers of World War II
Commanders of the Order of Leopold II
Commanders of the Order of Orange-Nassau
Companions of the Distinguished Service Order
Companions of the Order of the Bath
Foreign recipients of the Legion of Merit
Graduates of the Royal Military Academy, Woolwich
Graduates of the Staff College, Camberley
High Sheriffs of Anglesey
Knights Commander of the Order of the British Empire
Officers of the Legion of Merit
People educated at Felsted School
Royal Artillery officers